Derek Godfrey Kinne, GC (11 January 1930 – 6 February 2018) was a British Army soldier who awarded the George Cross for the valour he showed in withstanding torture at the hands of the Chinese Communist forces during the Korean War.

Kinne was serving with the Royal Northumberland Fusiliers when he was taken prisoner by the Chinese on the last day of the Battle of Imjin River on 25 April 1951. He escaped twice, the first time within a day of his capture, and was held in solitary confinement in ever more brutal conditions as a result of his unbreakable defiance. His final period of punishment was for wearing a rosette to celebrate Queen Elizabeth II's coronation. He was eventually released, in a prisoner exchange, on 10 August 1953.

Citation
Notice of his award was published in the London Gazette on 9 April 1954.—

Kinne's brother, Raymond, was killed in Korea while fighting with the Argyll and Sutherland Highlanders in 1950, the event which spurred Kinne to re-join the army to take revenge for his brother.

In 2010 Derek Kinne returned to Korea to commemorate the 60th Anniversary of the Korean War. Kinne died aged 87 after a battle with cancer on 6 February 2018 in Tucson, Arizona.

References

1931 births
British Army personnel of the Korean War
British prisoners of war in the Korean War
British recipients of the George Cross
English emigrants to the United States
2018 deaths
Royal Northumberland Fusiliers soldiers
Military personnel from Nottingham